"Ignite" is a song by Norwegian music producer K-391 featuring Norwegian DJ Alan Walker, Norwegian singer Julie Bergan and South Korean singer Seungri. It was released on 11 May 2018.

Composition
K391 & Alan Walker's track 'Ignite' is a reimagining of K391's 2015 hit 'Godzilla'. It was then in 2017 reworked for a promotion of the launch of the Sony Xperia XZs smartphone. An article mentioned: "“Ignite,” is quite an explosive, and heartwarming concoction. With a full injection of pitched-up, memorable synth progressions and passionate verses by Julie Bergen."

Achievements
Ignite was #1 in Norway Spotify, Top 20 in sweden Spotify, #3 on Finland Spotify, Top 100 on SHAZAM global charts, #1 China Western Chart on QQ music & KUWO, #1 Dance Charts in Switzerland, Top 200 Airplay in Germany, Top 30 Airplay in Poland, Soundtrack for Volkswagen 2018 China campaign,  in china Ignite streamed over 40M in the first month, Ignite was nominated as Song Of The Year in Norwegian Grammy Awards 2018 Spellemann, Trending on YouTube, K-391 YouTube Music Artist On The Rise, all the above achievement were made in 2018 alone, as of now  it has 250M+ stream on spotify, Its YouTube music video has been viewed over 400 million times, the auto-generated video by YouTube on K-391 Topic channel reach 20M+ views, K-391 & Julie Bergan played Ignite LIVE on Nobels fredsfest in Norway,

Music video
Ignite was consisted of 7 different video on youtube, the main video, music video, depicts three young people stuck in various troubles – bullies continually picked on one and haunted their daily life; another despised their work with waste management; and a third was harassed by a boss about not working hard or fast enough. However, they each found a set of headphones that took them to a destination that relieved them of their struggles, and helped them find their true happiness at last.

Charts

Weekly charts

Year-end charts

Certifications

References

2018 singles
2018 songs
Alan Walker (music producer) songs
Songs written by Alan Walker (music producer)